Gino Caviezel (born 23 June 1992) is a Swiss World Cup alpine ski racer from Tomils, Graubünden. He specializes in the giant slalom and competed for Switzerland in three Winter Olympics and six World Championships. He is the younger brother of alpine ski racer Mauro Caviezel.

World Cup results

Season standings

Race podiums
 0 wins
 3 podiums – (2 GS, 1 SG); 30 top tens

World Championship results

Olympic results

References

External links

Gino Caviezel at Head

1992 births
Living people
Swiss male alpine skiers
Olympic alpine skiers of Switzerland
Alpine skiers at the 2014 Winter Olympics
Alpine skiers at the 2018 Winter Olympics
Alpine skiers at the 2022 Winter Olympics
Sportspeople from Graubünden